Borsonia symbiotes is a species of sea snail, a marine gastropod mollusk in the family Borsoniidae.

Description
The height of the shell attains 70 mm. The shell is remarkable for its peculiar glistening white outer layer, with which it is most beautifully contrasted the pale cinnamon interior.

Distribution
This marine species occurs off the Laccadives and off East India, Malaya and Indonesia.

References

 Wood-Mason & Alcock. Natural history notes from H.M. Indian Marine Survey Steamer ‘Investigator,’ Commander R. F. Hoskyn, R.N., commanding.—Series II., No. 1. On the results of deep-sea dredging during the season 1890–91; Annals And Magazine of Natural History Ser. 6, Vol. VIII, 1891, p. 444, fig. 13a, b
 Smith. Ann. Mag. Nat. Hist. Ser. 6, Vol. XIV, 1894, p. 161, PI. 3, fig. 7, 8
 Schepman, 1913. The prosobranchia of the Siboga expedition. Part IV -V - VI: Toxoglossa; p. 421 
 .Alexander V. Sysoev, Deep-sea conoidean gastropods collected by the John Murray Expedition, 1933-34; Bulletin of the Natural History Museum v.62 # 1 (1996)

External links
 

symbiotes
Gastropods described in 1891